The FIFA World Cup is an international association football competition contested by the men's national teams of the members of Fédération Internationale de Football Association (FIFA), the sport's global governing body. The championship has been awarded every four years since the first tournament in 1930, except in 1942 and 1946, due to World War II.

The tournament consists of two parts, the qualification phase and the final phase (officially called the World Cup Finals). The qualification phase, which currently take place over the three years preceding the Finals, is used to determine which teams qualify for the Finals. The current format of the Finals involves 32 teams competing for the title, at venues within the host nation (or nations) over a period of about a month. The World Cup Finals is the most widely viewed sporting event in the world, with an estimated 715.1 million people watching the 2006 tournament final.

Paraguay have appeared in the finals of the World Cup on eight occasions, the first being at the very first finals in 1930, where they finished in 9th position. Their last participation in the tournament was in 2010, when they reached the quarter-finals for the first time.

Overall record 

*Denotes draws including knockout matches decided via penalty shoot-out.

By match

Record by opponent

The results
Paraguay competed at three World Cups by 1958, and after a long gap they re-appeared in 1986. Later, they achieved a streak of four participations: South Africa 2010 was Paraguay's fourth consecutive trip to the World Cup final tournament, having previously qualified for the final in 1998, 2002 and 2006. After a poor qualifying campaign, however, Paraguay failed to qualify for the tournament in 2014, missing out on the chance to play in a World Cup hosted on their own continent, in Brazil. Three times they survived the first round of the international football tournament, with the highlight being in 2010 where they reached the quarter-finals.

1930 FIFA World Cup

In the first round, Paraguay debuted and lost to the United States (0–3), to then defeat Belgium (1–0) with a goal by Luis Vargas Peña. Only one team was to advance from the group stage, and the U.S. left Paraguay behind.

Linesmen:
Martin Aphesteguy (Uruguay)
Anibal Tejada (Uruguay)

Linesmen:
José Macías (Argentina)
Domingo Lombardi (Uruguay)

1950 FIFA World Cup

In their return to the World Cup, Paraguay faced Sweden and Italy in Group 3. Paraguay failed to advance to the next round after a 2–2 draw against Sweden and a 2–0 loss against Italy.

1958 FIFA World Cup

For the 1958 World Cup, Paraguay surprisingly qualified ahead of Uruguay (beating them 5–0 in the decisive game) with a team that contained a formidable attacking lineup with stars such as Juan Bautista Agüero, José Parodi, Juan Romero, Cayetano Ré and Florencio Amarilla. In their first game in Sweden, Paraguay were 3–2 up against France in a game they lost 7–3. A 3–2 win over Scotland and a 3–3 draw with Yugoslavia saw Paraguay finish third in their group.

1986 FIFA World Cup

Paraguay ended a 28-year absence from the World Cup in 1986 with a team starring Roberto Fernández in goal; Cesar Zabala, Rogelio Delgado and Juan Bautista Torales in defense; Jorge Amado Nunes and Vladimiro Schettina in midfield; midfield playmaker Julio César Romero and strikers Roberto Cabañas, Ramón Hicks and Rolando Chilavert (older brother of José Luis Chilavert). In first round matches, Paraguay defeated Iraq (1–0, goal Romerito) and then tied Mexico (1–1, goal Romerito) and Belgium (2–2, both goals Roberto Cabañas). They reached the second round where they were beaten 3–0 by England.

1998 FIFA World Cup

A new generation of players helped end the World Cup drought in grand fashion, as the Albirroja reached the 1998 World Cup in France by qualifying in second place in South America, behind Argentina. The first round matches were against Bulgaria (0–0), Spain (0–0), and Nigeria (3–1; goals Celso Ayala, Miguel Ángel Benítez and José Cardozo). Paraguay qualified to the second round (round of 16) to be defeated in a thrilling match against hosts and eventual World Champions France. France only scored through Laurent Blanc in the 114th minute, during the second half of overtime (making it the first golden goal scored in a World Cup). Paraguay's central defending duo (Carlos Gamarra and Celso Ayala) and goalkeeper José Luis Chilavert were selected for the all-star World Cup team.

Assistant referees:
Achmat Salie (South Africa)
Hussain Ghadanfari (Kuwait)
Fourth official:
Nikolai Levnikov (Russia)

Assistant referees:
Aristidis Chris Soldatos (South Africa)
Owen Powell (Jamaica)
Fourth official:
Esse Baharmast (United States)

Assistant referees:
Mohamed Al Musawi (Oman)
Mikael Milsson (Sweden)
Fourth official:
Masayoshi Okada (Japan)

Assistant referees:
Nimal Wickeramatunge (Sri Lanka)
Lencie Fred (Vanuatu)
Fourth official:
Esse Baharmast (United States)

2002 FIFA World Cup

Paraguay returned to the world's greatest stage once more in the 2002 World Cup. In their first match, Paraguay tied South Africa 2–2 (goals: Roque Santa Cruz and Francisco Arce). Paraguay lost to Spain in the second game (1–3) and finally defeated Slovenia (3–1; goals Nelson Cuevas, twice, and Jorge Luis Campos) to qualify for the second round. Germany ended Paraguay's dreams in the World Cup with an 88-minute goal.

All times local (UTC+9)

Man of the Match:
Francisco Arce (Paraguay)

Assistant referees:
Igor Šramka (Slovakia)
Curtis Charles (Antigua and Barbuda)
Fourth official:
Hugh Dallas (Scotland)

Man of the Match:
Fernando Morientes (Spain)

Assistant referees:
Wagih Farag (Egypt)
Brighton Mudzamiri (Zimbabwe)
Fourth official:
Mohamed Guezzaz (Morocco)

Man of the Match:
Nelson Cuevas (Paraguay)

Assistant referees:
Leif Lindberg (Sweden)
Visva Krishnan (Singapore)
Fourth official:
Kim Young-joo (South Korea)

Man of the Match:
Jens Jeremies (Germany)

Assistant referees:
Curtis Charles (Antigua and Barbuda)
Dramane Dante (Mali)
Fourth official:
Hugh Dallas (Scotland)

2006 FIFA World Cup

In 2006, Paraguay qualified for its third World Cup in a row. This time, two early defeats against England and Sweden (both 0–1) sent the team home early. The only consolation was defeating Trinidad and Tobago during the last and final group game by 2–0.

All times local (CEST/UTC+2)

Man of the Match:
Frank Lampard (England)

Assistant referees:
José Luis Camargo (Mexico)
Leonel Leal (Costa Rica)
Fourth official:
Coffi Codjia (Benin)
Fifth official:
Celestin Ntagungira (Rwanda)

Man of the Match:
Freddie Ljungberg (Sweden)

Assistant referees:
Roman Slysko (Slovakia)
Martin Balko (Slovakia)
Fourth official:
Jerome Damon (South Africa)
Fifth official:
Enock Molefe (South Africa)

Man of the Match:
Julio dos Santos (Paraguay)

Assistant referees:
Cristiano Copelli (Italy)
Alessandro Stagnelli (Italy)
Fourth official:
Frank De Bleeckere (Belgium)
Fifth official:
Peter Hermans (Belgium)

2010 FIFA World Cup

In their fourth consecutive World Cup appearance, Paraguay eventually reached the quarter-finals. Drawn into Group F along with defending champions Italy, Slovakia and New Zealand, they opened their tournament with a draw against the Italians, holding them 1–1 thanks to a first-half goal from Antolín Alcaraz. In their second match, they beat Slovakia 2–0 with goals from Enrique Vera and Christian Riveros. Their final group match saw a goalless draw with New Zealand, clinching first place in Group F and setting up a date with Japan. Another goalless draw with the Japanese after 120 minutes went to penalties, which Paraguay won 5–3, advancing them for the first time in their history to the World Cup round of eight. In the quarter-finals, they met powerhouses Spain, to whom they lost 1–0 in a game where a goal by Nelson Valdez was controversially called an offside by the referee. The game also featured each team being awarded a penalty, both of which were contained, first by Spain's Iker Casillas and then Paraguay's Justo Villar (both were also team captains for the game).

The  Albirroja arrived back from South Africa on Monday, July 5 at 3:30 AM. Upon arrival, they were greeted by over 3,000 fans at the airport and were decorated by the President of Paraguay. Gerardo Martino announced that he would take some time to decide his future, although the Paraguayan Football Association has offered him a four-year contract to continue at the helm. Roque Santa Cruz also announced that this would be his last World Cup, but that he may play one more tournament, the Copa América in Argentina in 2011.

All times local (UTC+02)

Man of the Match:
Antolín Alcaraz (Paraguay)

Assistant referees:
Héctor Vergara (Canada)
Marvin Torrentera (Mexico)
Fourth official:
Joel Aguilar (El Salvador)
Fifth official:
Juan Zumba (El Salvador)

Man of the Match:
Enrique Vera (Paraguay)

Assistant referees:
Evarist Menkouande (Cameroon)
Bechir Hassani (Tunisia)
Fourth official:
Joel Aguilar (El Salvador)
Fifth official:
Juan Zumba (El Salvador)

Man of the Match:
Roque Santa Cruz (Paraguay)

Assistant referees:
Toru Sagara (Japan)
Jeong Hae-sang (South Korea)
Fourth official:
Koman Coulibaly (Mali)
Fifth official:
Inacio Manuel Candido (Angola)

Paraguay and Japan met at the Loftus Versfeld Stadium in Pretoria on 29 June 2010. The match was decided by a penalty shootout after the score was locked at 0–0 for 120 minutes. Paraguay won the shootout and progressed to its first ever World Cup quarter-final. The match was a generally unexciting affair, as Japan adopted a defensive posture while Paraguay itself maintained a solid defence. The first half produced the occasional chance on goal with Lucas Barrios having a shot saved shortly before a long-distance shot from Daisuke Matsui hit the crossbar of Paraguay's goal. The second half was similar, with either side producing occasional chances to score rather than periods of dominance. The result of the deadlock was extra time, which continued goalless. A penalty shootout ensued, in which Yūichi Komano missed a spot kick for Japan. Paraguay scored all five of its penalties, clinching the win and passage to the quarter-finals. After the match, Japan head coach Takeshi Okada resigned and Shunsuke Nakamura retired from international football.

Man of the Match:
Keisuke Honda (Japan)

Assistant referees:
Peter Hermans (Belgium)
Walter Vromans (Belgium)
Fourth official:
Peter O'Leary (New Zealand)
Fifth official:
Matthew Taro (Solomon Islands)

On 3 July 2010, Spain defeated Paraguay 1–0 to secure entry to the semi-finals where they would meet Germany. It was the first time that Spain had progressed to the semi-final of a World Cup since 1950; while for the defeated Paraguay, the quarter-final appearance was also the country's best ever performance.

The first half of the match finished goalless, although both sides had chances to score and Paraguay's Nelson Valdez had a goal ruled out as offside. The match suddenly became eventful in the second half due to a string of penalty kicks. First, Óscar Cardozo was pulled down by Gerard Piqué in Spain's penalty area and Paraguay was awarded a penalty. Cardozo took the penalty himself but it was saved by Spain's goalkeeper Iker Casillas. Spain soon after launched an attack at the other end of the field, in which David Villa was ruled by the referee to have been brought down by Antolín Alcaraz. Xabi Alonso stepped up to take the penalty kick and seemed to have scored, only for the referee to order it be retaken because of encroachment by a Spanish player into the penalty area before the kick was taken. Xabi Alonso's retake was saved by Paraguayan goalkeeper Justo Villar. As a result, the score remained 0–0 after the three penalty kicks. Spain, however, ultimately managed to take the lead in the 82nd minute: David Villa collected a rebounded shot off the post from Pedro, to score himself off the post. The goal turned out to be the winner for Spain. After the match, Spain coach Vicente del Bosque conceded that his side were not playing at their best and were starved of possession. He also noted his view that Spain's next opponents Germany were the best team at the World Cup. Paraguay coach Gerardo Martino stated he would be leaving his position at the end of his contract.

Man of the Match:
Andrés Iniesta (Spain)

Assistant referees:
Leonel Leal (Costa Rica)
Carlos Pastrana (Honduras)
Fourth official:
Benito Archundia (Mexico)
Fifth official:
Héctor Vergara (Canada)

Record players

World Cup goalscorers

References

External links
Paraguay at FIFA
World Cup Finals Statistics

 
Paraguay national football team
Countries at the FIFA World Cup